{{DISPLAYTITLE:C15H14O2}}
The molecular formula C15H14O2 (molar mass : 226.27 g/mol, exact mass: 226.0994 u) may refer to:

 Flavan-3-ol 
 Flavan-4-ol 

Molecular formulas